Nasir Nawaz (born 5 October 1998) is a Pakistani cricketer.

Career 
He made his List A debut for Punjab in the 2017 Pakistan Cup on 19 April 2017. Prior to his List A debut, he was named as captain of Pakistan's squad for the 2016 Under-19 Asia Cup. He made his Twenty20 debut for Rawalpindi in the 2017–18 National T20 Cup on 12 November 2017. He made his first-class debut on 20 November 2020, for Northern, in the 2020–21 Quaid-e-Azam Trophy. In January 2021, he was named in Northern's squad for the 2020–21 Pakistan Cup. In February 2022, he was drafted by Islamabad United for the remainder of the 2022 Pakistan Super League, as a replacement for Alex Hales.

References

External links
 

1998 births
Living people
Pakistani cricketers
Punjab (Pakistan) cricketers
Rawalpindi cricketers
People from Rawalpindi
Islamabad United cricketers